Istvan Antal (September 18, 1958 – January 9, 2009) was a Romanian ice hockey player. Born in Frumoasa, Romania, he played for the Romania men's national ice hockey team at the 1980 Winter Olympics in Lake Placid.

References

1958 births
2009 deaths
Ice hockey players at the 1980 Winter Olympics
Olympic ice hockey players of Romania
People from Harghita County
Romanian ice hockey defencemen
Romanian sportspeople of Hungarian descent